Peter Agrums (born 22 September 1940) is a former Australian rules football player who played eleven games for North Melbourne in the Victorian Football League (VFL) between 1963 and 1964. He played as a ruckman and was recruited from Golden Point. In 1975, he became the coach of the University of Wollongong football team.

References

External links

1940 births
Living people
Australian rules footballers from Victoria (Australia)
North Melbourne Football Club players
Golden Point Football Club players